Luke Thomas Michael Hall (born 16 April 1989) is a Swazi swimmer.  

He competed at the 2008 Summer Olympics and the 2012 Summer Olympics where he represented Swaziland. At the 2012 Summer Olympics, he came fourth in his heat with the time of 23.48s.

References

1989 births
Living people
People from Hhohho Region
Swazi male swimmers
Olympic swimmers of Eswatini
Commonwealth Games competitors for Eswatini
Swimmers at the 2008 Summer Olympics
Swimmers at the 2012 Summer Olympics
Swimmers at the 2006 Commonwealth Games
Swimmers at the 2010 Commonwealth Games
Swazi people of British descent